Mixed Doubles is a 1933 British comedy film directed by Sidney Morgan and starring Jeanne De Casalis, Frederick Lloyd and Cyril Rymond.

It was shot at British and Dominions Elstree Studios as a quota quickie for release by Paramount Pictures.

Cast
 Jeanne De Casalis as Betty Irvine 
 Frederick Lloyd as Sir John Doyle 
 Molly Johnson as Lady Audrey 
 Cyril Raymond as Reggie Irving 
 Atholl Fleming as Ian MacConochie 
 Rani Waller as Rose MacConochie 
 Quinton McPherson as Reverend Arthur Escott 
 George McLeod as Consul 
 George Bellamy as Barrett

References

Bibliography
 Chibnall, Steve. Quota Quickies: The Birth of the British 'B' Film. British Film Institute, 2007.
 Low, Rachael. Filmmaking in 1930s Britain. George Allen & Unwin, 1985.
 Wood, Linda. British Films, 1927-1939. British Film Institute, 1986.

External links

1933 films
British comedy films
1933 comedy films
Films shot at Imperial Studios, Elstree
Paramount Pictures films
Quota quickies
Films directed by Sidney Morgan
British black-and-white films
1930s English-language films
1930s British films